The 2012 NCAA Division I men's soccer tournament is a single-elimination tournament involving 48 teams to determine the champion of the 2012 NCAA Division I men's soccer season. It was the 54th edition of the tournament. Indiana defeated Georgetown, 1–0, to win its 8th national title.

Qualified Teams

A total of 48 teams will qualify into the tournament proper, either automatically, or through an at-large bid that is determined by a selection committee. Each conference that field varsity soccer teams are admitted one automatic berth into the tournament. Depending on the conference, that automatic berth is either given the champions of the regular season, or the tournament that culminates the regular season. Twenty-two teams earn automatic bids into the tournament, while 26 enter through an at-large bid.

Format 

Like previous editions of the NCAA Division I Tournament, the tournament will feature 48 participants out of a possible field of 198 teams. Of the 48 berths, 22 are allocated to the conference tournament or regular season winners. The remaining 26 berths are determined through an at-large process based upon teams' Ratings Percentage Index that did not win their conference tournament.

From there, the NCAA Selection Committee selects the top sixteen seeds for the tournament, that earn an automatic bye to the second round of the tournament. The remaining 32 teams play in a single-elimination match in the first round of the tournament, to play a seeded team in the second round.

Seeded teams 

 Automatic A = Conference tournament winner.
 Automatic B = Conference regular season champion, conference has no tournament.

Schedule

Bracket

Regional 1

Regional 2

Regional 3

Regional 4

College Cup – Regions Park, Hoover, Alabama

Results

First round

Second round

Third round

Quarterfinals

College Cup

Semifinals

Championship

Statistics

Goalscorers
A total of 123 goals were scored over 47 matches, for an average of 2.62 goals per match.

5 goals
 Nikita Kotlov – Indiana
4 goals
 Patrick Mullins – Maryland
3 goals

 Brandon Allen – Georgetown
 Steve Neumann – Georgetown
 Dylan Mares – Louisville
 Fabio Pereira – Michigan
 Connor Brandt – San Diego

2 goals

 Jennings Rex – Charlotte
 Pedro Ribeiro – Coastal Carolina
 Mamadou Diouf – Connecticut
 Christian Blandon – Creighton
 Timo Pitter – Creighton
 Femi Hollinger-Janzen – Indiana
 Eriq Zavaleta – Indiana
 Zach Foxhoven – Louisville
 Sunny Jane – Maryland
 Schillo Tshuma - Maryland
 Patrick Wallen – San Diego
 Louis Clark – Syracuse

1 goal

 Reinaldo Brenes – Akron
 Thomas Schmitt – Akron
 Eric Stevenson – Akron
 Bobby Belair – Brown
 Thomas McNamara – Brown
 Daniel Taylor – Brown
 Sagi Lev-Ari – Cal State Northridge
 Giuseppe Gentile – Charlotte
 Cristian Arboleda – Cleveland State
 Ashton Bennett – Coastal Carolina
 Justin Portillo – Coastal Carolina
 Matt Risher – Coastal Carolina
 Jakub Štourač – Coastal Carolina
 Nicholas Zuniga – Connecticut
 Brent Kallman – Creighton
 Andrew Ribeiro – Creighton
 Jan Aubert – Fairleigh Dickinson
 Jack McVey – Fairleigh Dickinson
 Anthony Moore – Fairleigh Dickinson
 Andy Reimer – Georgetown
 Melvin Snoh – Georgetown
 Greg Cochrane – Louisville
 Marlon Hairston – Louisville
 Mikias Eticha – Maryland
 Christiano François – Maryland
 Dan Metzger – Maryland
 Jake Pace – Maryland
 Jereme Raley – Maryland
 London Woodberry – Maryland
 James Murphy – Michigan
 Adam Montague – Michigan State
 Nick Wilson – Michigan State
 Michael Calderón – New Mexico
 James Rogers – New Mexico
 Devon Sandoval – New Mexico
 Kyle Venter – New Mexico
 Bryan da Cruz – Niagara
 Cameron Brown – North Carolina
 Dante Marini – Northeastern
 Jarrett Baughman – Northwestern
 Joey Calistri – Northwestern
 Nick Gendron – Northwestern
 Ryan Finley – Notre Dame
 Max Lachowecki – Notre Dame
 Kyle Richard – Notre Dame
 Harry Shipp – Notre Dame
 James Cohn – San Diego
 Dan Delgado – San Diego
 Sergio Lopez – San Diego
 Conor McFadden – San Diego
 Julian Ringhof – San Diego
 Robbie Kristo – Saint Louis
 Eddie Puskarich – Southern Methodist
 Lars Müller – Syracuse
 Stefanos Stamoulacatos – Syracuse
 Jordan Vale – Syracuse
 Cristian Mata – Tulsa
 Omar Mata – Tulsa
 Mladen Lemez – UAB
 Diego Navarrete – UAB
 Ryan Hollingshead – UCLA
 Evan Raynr – UCLA
 Will Bates – Virginia
 Matt Brown – Virginia
 Dennis Castillo – VCU
 Juan Monge Solano – VCU
 Michael Gamble – Wake Forest
 Michael Harris – Washington
 James Moberg – Washington
 Dylan Tucker-Gangnes – Washington
 Achille Obougou – Winthrop
 Luke Spencer – Xavier
 Matt Walker – Xavier

Own goals
 Grant Wilson – Northwestern (playing against Louisville)
San Diego (playing against Georgetown)

See also
NCAA Men's Soccer Championship
2012 NCAA Division I men's soccer season

Footnotes

References 

2012 NCAA Division I men's soccer season
NCAA Division I Men's Soccer Tournament seasons
NCAA
NCAA Division I men's soccer tournament
NCAA Division I men's soccer tournament